Frangky Amo (born February 27, 1986) is an Indonesian footballer who currently plays for Persidafon Dafonsoro in the Indonesia Super League.

Club statistics

References

External links

1986 births
Association football defenders
Living people
Indonesian footballers
Papuan sportspeople
Liga 1 (Indonesia) players
Persidafon Dafonsoro players
Indonesian Premier Division players
Place of birth missing (living people)
21st-century Indonesian people